This list is of the Historic Sites of Japan located within the Prefecture of Tochigi.

National Historic Sites
As of 1 December 2022, thirty-eight Sites have been designated as being of national significance (including two *Special Historic Sites).

| align="center"|Karasuyama Castle SiteKarasuyama-jō ato || Nasukarasuyama || ||  ||  || || 
|-
|}

Prefectural Historic Sites
As of 1 May 2022, forty-nine Sites have been designated as being of prefectural importance.

Municipal Historic Sites
As of 1 May 2022, a further four hundred and five Sites have been designated as being of municipal importance.

See also

 Cultural Properties of Japan
 Shimotsuke Province
 Tochigi Prefectural Museum
 List of Places of Scenic Beauty of Japan (Tochigi)

References

External links
 Cultural Properties of Tochigi Prefecture  

Tochigi Prefecture
 Tochigi